Parliamentary elections were held in Albania on 23 June 2013. The result was a victory for the Alliance for a European Albania led by the Socialist Party and its leader, Edi Rama. Incumbent Prime Minister Sali Berisha of the Democratic Party-led Alliance for Employment, Prosperity and Integration conceded defeat on 26 June, widely viewed as a sign of growing democratic maturity in Albania.

Background
The previous parliamentary elections were held on 28 June 2009 and resulted in a victory for the Democratic Party of Albania-led Alliance of Change, which received 46.92 of the vote, winning 70 of the 140 seats. The opposition Union for Change headed by Edi Rama of the Socialist Party received almost 45.34% of the vote and won the other 66 seats. The Democratic Party led by Sali Berisha formed the government with Berisha as Prime Minister.

Electoral system
The 140 members of Parliament were elected in twelve multi-member constituencies based on the twelve counties using closed list proportional representation with an electoral threshold of 3% for parties and 5% for alliances. Seats were allocated to alliances using the d'Hondt method, then to political parties using the Sainte-Laguë method.

Alliances
Prior to the election two major coalitions were formed, whilst four parties and two independent candidates ran alone. In total there were 66 parties.

Alliance for Employment, Prosperity and Integration (Aleanca për Punësim, Mirëqenie dhe Integrim) is a coalition of 25 centrist and center-right parties. It was led by the then Prime Minister, Sali Berisha.
Alliance for a European Albania (Aleanca për Shqipërinë Europiane) is a big tent coalition containing 37 opposition parties that vary from far left to right-wing. It was led by the then Leader of the Opposition, now Prime Minister, Edi Rama.

Opinion polls

By party

By alliance

Conduct
The Central Election Commission was criticised for not replacing three of the seven member committee who had resigned in April following a dispute between the government and the opposition.

On election day, a shootout occurred in Laç resulting in the death of the LSI activist Gjon Pjeter Gjoni and injuring the PD candidate Mhill Fufi.

Results

By county

Aftermath

Early on election day both Sali Berisha and Edi Rama claimed victory. On 25 June, Edi Rama gave his victory speech saying, "I will be your prime minister, but also your prime servant. The duty will be mine; the authority will be yours." On 26 June, after vote counting was finally complete, the outgoing Prime Minister, Sali Berisha, publicly accepted the result, took responsibility for the loss, resigned from his functions in the Democratic Party, and wished his opponent well in his new duties.

Notes

References

2013 in Albania
Parliamentary elections in Albania
Albania
June 2013 events in Europe